Lusai or Lue Sai was a king of Lan Xang who ruled for six months, before he committed suicide rather than face assassination by Nang Keo Phimpha. He was the oldest son of Samsenthai who had been passed over by his younger brothers. Lusai succeeded his brother Kham Tam Sa. Before he was king he was appointed as Governor of Muang Kabong. Rather than face assassination, he committed suicide in the palace gardens.

References

Kings of Lan Xang
Buddhist monarchs
Year of birth unknown
15th-century deaths
15th-century Laotian people
15th-century monarchs in Asia
Laotian Theravada Buddhists
Suicides in Asia